Tiwanaku River (also spelled Tiwanacu) or Wakira River (Aymara, hispanicized Cuaquira, Guaquira) is a Bolivian river southeast of Lake Titicaca in the La Paz Department, Ingavi Province, in the municipalities of Guaqui and Tiwanaku, and in the Los Andes Province, Laja Municipality. It empties into Wiñaymarka Lake, the southern part of Lake Titicaca, north of Guaqui (Waki) near the villages of Jawira Pampa and Uma Marka. On its way along the southern slopes of the Taraco range it flows along the archaeological site of Tiwanaku.

Some of its left tributaries are Ch'alla Jawira ("sand river") and Ch'amaka Jawira ("dark river"). Kunturiri, Allqamari and Jaru Uma are right affluenets.

See also 
 Chilla-Kimsa Chata mountain range
 Katari River

References

Rivers of La Paz Department (Bolivia)